Barry Cunningham may refer to:
 Barry Cunningham (politician), Australian politician
 Barry Cunningham (publisher), British publisher
 Barry Cunningham (Gaelic footballer), Irish Gaelic footballer